Carsta Löck (28 December 1902 – 9 October 1993) was a German film actress.

Selected filmography

 Refugees (1933)
 Ripening Youth (1933)
 The Double Fiance (1934)
 Trouble with Jolanthe (1934)
 Police Report (1934)
 The Four Musketeers (1934)
 The Valiant Navigator (1935)
 Everything for a Woman (1935)
 Uncle Bräsig (1936)
 Game on Board (1936)
 When the Cock Crows (1936)
 Heimweh (1937)
 Autobus S (1937)
  (1937)
 The Four Companions (1938)
 Shoulder Arms (1939)
 Cadets (1939)
 D III 88 (1939)
 Legion Condor (1939)
 The Girl at the Reception (1940)
  (1941)
 Above All Else in the World (1941)
  (1941)
 The Crew of the Dora (1943)
 Between Yesterday and Tomorrow (1947)
 Film Without a Title (1948)
 Friday the Thirteenth (1949)
 Derby (1949)
 Girls in Gingham (1949)
 The Great Mandarin (1949)
 The Cuckoos (1949)
 Wedding with Erika (1950)
 Weekend in Paradise (1952)
 Holiday From Myself (1952)
 Captain Bay-Bay (1953)
 Dutch Girl (1953)
 Lady's Choice (1953)
 Christina (1953)
 The Country Schoolmaster (1954)
 It Was Always So Nice With You (1954)
 A Woman of Today (1954)
 The Angel with the Flaming Sword (1954)
 The Major and the Bulls (1955)
 Reaching for the Stars (1955)
 Melody of the Heart (1956)
 Fruit in the Neighbour's Garden (1956)
 Melody of the Heath (1956)
 Three Birch Trees on the Heath (1956)
 Widower with Five Daughters (1957)
 Man in the River (1958)
 My Schoolfriend (1958)
 The Buddenbrooks (1959)
 Paprika (1959)
 Two Times Adam, One Time Eve (1959)
 My Schoolfriend (1960)
  (1968, TV film)
 Emil i Lönneberga (1971)
 New Mischief by Emil (1972)
 Emil and the Piglet (1973)

Bibliography

External links

1902 births
1993 deaths
German film actresses
German television actresses
Actors from Schleswig-Holstein
20th-century German actresses
People from Nordfriesland